Escadrille Spa.78 (originally Escadrille N.78) was a French fighter squadron active from December 1916 until the end of World War I on 11 November 1918. It spent most of its existence as a component of a larger Groupe de Combat involved in offensive operations. The squadron was credited with a minimum of 40 confirmed aerial victories during the war.

History

Escadrille N.78 was organized on 12 December 1916 at Saint Etienne-a-Temple, France. It was formed under the guidance of Lieutenant Armand Pinsard. On 17 March 1917, it was one of four squadrons combined into Groupe de Combat 15 in support of IV Armee. In the latter part of 1917, the squadron re-equipped with SPAD fighters, and renamed Escadrille Spa.78.

The squadron would fight as part of the Groupe until the Armistice on 11 November 1918. The Groupe would operate with various French field armies until 10 September 1918. It fought in support of the U.S. First Army until 28 September, when it passed to support of IV Armee. On 23 October 1918, it moved to its final assignment with V Armee.

Escadrille Spa.78 ended World War I credited with destruction of at least 40 German aircraft, with another 40 claims judged probable victories.

Commanding officers

 Lieutenant Armand Pinsard: 12 December 1916wounded in action 12 July 1917
 Capitaine Eugene Verdon: 12 July 1917 - 25 September 1917
 Capitaine Gustave Lagache: 25 September 1917 - war's end

Notable members

 Lieutenant Armand Pinsard
 Sous lieutenant Pierre Le Roy de Boiseaumarié

Aircraft

 Various types of Nieuport fighters: 12 December 1916 - late 1917
 SPAD fighters: Late 1917 - war's end

End notes

Reference
 Franks, Norman; Bailey, Frank (1993). Over the Front: The Complete Record of the Fighter Aces and Units of the United States and French Air Services, 1914–1918 London, UK: Grub Street Publishing. .

Fighter squadrons of the French Air and Space Force
Military units and formations established in 1916
Military units and formations disestablished in 1918
Military units and formations of France in World War I
Military aviation units and formations in World War I